Michael John Morris (born 8 March 1969) is an Australian-born English former first-class cricketer.

Morris was born at Melbourne in March 1969, but moved to England where he was educated in Oxford at Cherwell School. From there he went up to Pembroke College, Cambridge. While studying at Cambridge, he played first-class cricket for Cambridge University Cricket Club from 1989 to 1991, making 25 appearances. Playing as a middle order batsman in the Cambridge side, he scored 452 runs in his 25 matches at an average of 13.29, with a highest score of 60; this score was the only time he passed 50.

References

External links

1969 births
Living people
Sportspeople from Melbourne
Australian emigrants to England
Alumni of Pembroke College, Cambridge
English cricketers
Cambridge University cricketers